The Hunter class was a class of two sloops of wooden construction built for the Royal Navy between 1755 and 1756. Both were built by contract with commercial builders to a common design prepared by Thomas Slade, the Surveyor of the Navy.

Both were ordered on 5 August 1755, and contracts with the builders were agreed on 8 August. They were two-masted (snow-rigged) vessels, although the Hunter was built with a 'pink' or very narrow stern (and a keel 3 feet longer than the original design), while her sister Viper had a traditional 'square' stern.

Hunter was captured by two American privateers off Boston on 23 November 1775, but was retaken by HMS Greyhound the following day.

Vessels

References 

McLaughlan, Ian. The Sloop of War 1650-1763. Seaforth Publishing, 2014. .
Winfield, Rif. British Warships in the Age of Sail 1714-1792: Design, Construction, Careers and Fates. Seaforth Publishing, 2007. .

Sloop classes